Nose is used in the name of several geographical features and their associated settlements:

Anthonys Nose (Victoria), a point or escarpment on the southern shore of Port Phillip Bay, in Victoria, Australia
Anthony's Nose (Westchester), a peak along the Hudson River at the north end of Westchester County, New York 
Blake Nose, a submerged peninsula extending northeast from the North American continental shelf, about 280 miles east of Daytona Beach, Florida
Bowerman's Nose, a stack of weathered granite on Dartmoor, Devon, England
Brokers Nose, a point on the Illawarra Range, in the state of New South Wales, Australia
Calgary Nose Hill, a federal electoral district in Alberta, Canada
Calgary-Nose Creek, provincial electoral district that encompassed the Northern Central part of Calgary, Alberta
 Devil's Nose in Ecuador
Devils Nose, Kentucky, unincorporated community in Bath County, Kentucky, United States
Dolphin's Nose, Coonoor, a viewpoint and tourist spot in Coonoor, The Nilgiris District, Tamil Nadu
Fawnie Nose, the highest summit of the Fawnie Range of the Nechako Plateau in the Central Interior of British Columbia, Canada
Grey Nose Cape, a cape on the Côte d'Opale in the Pas-de-Calais département in northern France
Jacob's Nose,  mountain in Rosendale Village, a hamlet in the town of Rosendale, in Ulster County, New York
Jerry's Nose, fishing community, part of a designated place in the Canadian province of Newfoundland and Labrador
Long Nose Park, a  public open space at the end of Yurulbin Point on the Balmain Peninsula in Sydney, New South Wales, Australia
Napoleon's Nose, a basaltic hill overlooking the city of Belfast, Northern Ireland
Nose, Osaka, a town in Toyono District, Osaka Prefecture, Japan
Nose Hill Park, the second largest urban park in Canada and one of the largest urban parks in North America
Nose mound, a monument in Kyoto, Japan, dedicated to the sliced noses of killed Korean soldiers and civilians
Nose Station, a train station in Tsubata, Kahoku District, Ishikawa Prefecture, Japan
Roman Nose State Park, state park located in Blaine County, 7 miles (11 km) north of Watonga, Oklahoma
Sharks Nose, a mountain in the southern Wind River Range in the U.S. state of Wyoming
The Devil's Nose, a steep but small mountain ridge between the Little Cacapon and Potomac rivers in northeastern Hampshire County, West Virginia
The Nose (El Capitan), one of the original technical climbing routes up El Capitan, a vertical rock formation in Yosemite National Park
Vroman's Nose, prominent geological feature in the town of Fulton in Schoharie County, New York, United States
White Nose, Dorset, a chalk headland on the English Channel coast at the eastern end of Ringstead Bay, east of Weymouth in Dorset, England

See also
Nose (disambiguation)

Geography-related lists